Sahoo is an Indian surname predominantly found in the state of Odisha. Notable people with the surname include:

Ainthu Sahoo (1928 - 2013), Indian politician
Alok Chandra Sahoo (born 1989), Indian cricketer
Anwesh Sahoo (born 1995), Indian blogger
Batakrushna Sahoo, Indian farmer
Kanak Manjari Sahoo (born 1957), Indian short story writer
Mahesh Sahoo, Indian politician
Mohapatra Nilamani Sahoo (1926 - 2016), Indian short story writer
Sarojini Sahoo (born 1956), Indian feminist writer
Subhrajit Sahoo (born 1988), Indian cricketer
Subrat Sahoo (born 1968), Indian politician
Sudarshan Sahoo (born 1939), Indian sculptor
Tukuna Sahoo (born 1987), Indian cricketer

Indian surnames